Broda is a surname. Notable people with this surname include:

 Ana Casas Broda (born 1965), Mexican photographer
 Abraham ben Saul Broda ( 1640–1717), Bohemian rabbi
 Christian Broda (1916–1987), Austrian politician
 Dave Broda (1944–2010), Canadian politician
 Engelbert Broda (1910–1983), Austrian scientist, brother of Christian
 Hal Broda (1905–1989), American football player
 Jan Broda (born 1940), Czechoslovak athlete
 Joel Broda (born 1989), Canadian ice hockey player
 Marzena Broda (born 1965), Polish poet
 Martine Broda (1947–2009), French poet
 Turk Broda (1914–1972), Canadian ice hockey player

See also
 

Polish-language surnames